The 2020 season was the Tampa Bay Buccaneers' 45th in the National Football League (NFL) and their second under head coach Bruce Arians. The club acquired long-time New England Patriots quarterback Tom Brady and traded for Brady's former Patriots teammate, tight end Rob Gronkowski during the offseason. They improved on their 7–9 record from the previous season by finishing 11–5 to qualify for the playoffs for the first time since 2007- though 10 of their 11 wins were against non-playoff teams. They advanced through the playoffs to reach and win Super Bowl LV. They were the first team only having one Pro Bowler to do so since the 2007 Giants, and the first team to play in and win the Super Bowl in their home stadium, Raymond James Stadium. They were the 7th wild card team in NFL history to win the Super Bowl, as well as the fifth team to win three road games to advance to the Super Bowl, joining the 2010 Green Bay Packers, 2007 New York Giants, 2005 Pittsburgh Steelers, and 1985 New England Patriots.

The team unveiled new uniforms in April 2020, their first uniform change since 2014. The uniforms are similar in design to the ones they wore from 1997 to 2013.

Season summary
The offseason began strong with the team re-signing outside linebacker Jason Pierre-Paul and defensive end Ndamukong Suh. Pierre-Paul and Suh were re-signed after the team placed the franchise tag on outside linebacker Shaquil Barrett, the then-reigning NFL sack leader with 19.5 sacks in 2019. Bringing them back was crucial, as they helped the Buccaneers finish 2019 with the best run defense in the league.

The biggest move was the acquisition of long-time New England Patriots quarterback Tom Brady. At the conclusion of the 2019 season, 2015 first-round draft pick Jameis Winston arrived at the end of his initial five-year contract, resulting in a period of uncertainty at the quarterback position. The club declined to apply the franchise tag to Winston (instead using it on linebacker Shaquil Barrett), nor the transition tag, which was also available for 2020. It thus became clear that the team planned to part ways with Winston. On March 20, 2020, the team agreed to terms with free agent Brady. The Buccaneers also traded for Brady's former Patriots teammate, tight end Rob Gronkowski. They would also sign veterans LeSean McCoy and Leonard Fournette. On October 23, 2020, the Buccaneers signed former All-Pro wide receiver Antonio Brown, marking his return to the NFL after a one-year hiatus.

With high expectations going into the season, the team nevertheless had various growing pains during the season. The team began the season with a loss at New Orleans on Opening Day. The team rebounded to win their next two games in strong fashion. In Week 4 against the Chargers, The Buccaneers rallied from a 17-point deficit to improve to 3–1. After a somewhat embarrassing loss on Thursday night at Chicago in Week 5, the Buccaneers again bounced back, this time with a commanding 38–10 win over the previously undefeated Packers. In that game, Tampa Bay overcame a 10–0 deficit following Jamel Dean's early pick-six. They followed that with a 45-point showing in a win at Las Vegas, and a close Monday Night win at the Giants, to improve their record to 6–2. The month of November saw Tampa Bay hit a skid, as they lost three out of four games. They were routed at home by New Orleans, then dropped close games against both the Rams and Chiefs. Each of those three teams would make the playoffs. The loss to the Saints would set a record as the worst loss (35 point margin) by a Super Bowl champion.

Brady later said that playing behind closed doors because of the COVID-19 pandemic made it easier for him to execute his new team's unfamiliar football playbook. With a late season bye week (Week 13), Tampa Bay rested and regrouped, and would not lose another game. The Buccaneers clinched their first winning season since 2016 after a come-from-behind Week 15 win over Atlanta. Despite losing the division title to rival New Orleans Saints on Christmas Day, the Buccaneers qualified for the playoffs the following day for the first time since 2007 with a 47–7 rout over Detroit. It ended the league's second-longest active post-season drought.

In the Wild Card round, Tampa Bay won their first playoff game since Super Bowl XXXVII, defeating Washington 31–23. They advanced to the Divisional round against the New Orleans Saints, who had swept them in the regular season. Tampa Bay defeated the Saints 30–20 to avenge those losses and advance to the NFC Championship Game. The Buccaneers then beat the top-seeded Green Bay Packers in the NFC Championship Game 31–26 to advance to Super Bowl LV, where they defeated the Kansas City Chiefs 31–9 for their second Super Bowl title.

To win the Super Bowl, the Buccaneers had to defeat three Super Bowl MVP quarterbacks. In order they beat Drew Brees (XLIV), Aaron Rodgers (XLV), and Patrick Mahomes (LIV). They were the first team in NFL history to play in a Super Bowl in its home stadium and the seventh team to win the Super Bowl as a wild card team. They joined the 1985 Patriots, 2005 Steelers, 2007 Giants, and 2010 Packers as the only NFL teams to win three straight playoff games on the road. The team mimicked the 2002 team by also defeating the top-ranked offense in the Super Bowl, and forcing multiple turnovers in the Super Bowl.

Head coach Bruce Arians became the oldest head coach in NFL history to win a Super Bowl while assistant defensive line coach Lori Locust and assistant strength and conditioning coach Maral Javadifar became the first female coaches in NFL history to win a Super Bowl. The Buccaneers also joined the Baltimore Ravens as the only franchises to currently be undefeated in multiple Super Bowl appearances, and now have the most titles of any team in the NFC South. Quarterback Tom Brady won his seventh Super Bowl ring, later revealing that he played the entire season with a torn MCL.

The Buccaneers defense, somewhat maligned over the previous several seasons, improved in several categories. In total yards allowed, they improved from 15th in the league the previous season to 6th. In 2017 they had ranked last. In passing yards allowed, they improved from 30th in 2019 to 21st. In total points allowed, they improved from 29th in 2019 to 8th. They also flipped the turnover margin from –13 in 2019 to +8 in 2020.

Several franchise records were set during the regular season. Tom Brady threw a Buccaneers record 40 touchdown passes, while Mike Evans had a record 13 receiving touchdowns. Evans became the first wide receiver in NFL history with 1,000+ yards receiving in each of his first seven seasons. Brady posted the best season passer rating (102.2) in team history, and also tallied the most games with four or more touchdown passes (4). The team set a new high for most points scored (492) and most total touchdowns (59). Kicker Ryan Succop set a team record for most points by an individual player during a single season with 136. The team also set a club record with eight consecutive overall wins (and ultimately extended the streak to 10 in 2021).

Roster changes

Free agency 
The Buccaneers entered free agency with the following:

Unrestricted

Signings

Trades

NFL Draft

Draft trades
 The Buccaneers traded their 2020 first-round and 2020 fourth-round selections to the San Francisco 49ers in exchange for San Francisco's 2020 first-round (via Indianapolis) and 2020 seventh-round selections.
 The Buccaneers traded their 2020 seventh-round selection and wide receiver DeSean Jackson to the Philadelphia Eagles in exchange for Philadelphia's sixth-round 2019 selection.

Undrafted free agents

Staff

Final roster

Preseason
The Buccaneers' preseason schedule was announced on May 7, but was later cancelled due to the COVID-19 pandemic.

Regular season

Schedule
The Buccaneers' 2020 schedule was announced on May 7.

Note: Intra-division opponents are in bold text.

Game summaries

Week 1: at New Orleans Saints

Tom Brady made his debut at quarterback with the Buccaneers against division rival New Orleans on opening day. Due to COVID-19, the game was played at the Superdome without spectators. Brady faced Drew Brees, the first game in NFL history where both starting quarterbacks were over the age of 40. Brady led the Buccaneers on a 9-play, 85-yard opening drive, which was capped off by a 2-yard QB keeper, and an early 7–0 lead. Turnovers and miscues by the Buccaneers, however, were the prevailing story of the day. Brady threw two interceptions, one returned for a touchdown, and the Saints won 34–23.

Registering a 13.1 rating, it was the highest-rated regular season game of the 2020 NFL season, and second most-watched measured by total viewers (25.9 million).

Week 2: vs. Carolina Panthers

Tom Brady threw for 217 yards and one touchdown pass, as Tampa Bay defeated Carolina in their home opener, their first win of the season. Due to COVID-19, the game was played at Raymond James Stadium without spectators. Leonard Fournette rushed for 103 yards and two touchdowns, while Mike Evans, who saw limited play in week 1 due to a hamstring injury, rebounded with 104 yards receiving and one touchdown. The Buccaneers jumped out to a 21–0 lead at halftime and held on for a 31–17 victory. The Tampa Bay defense forced four turnovers, and stuffed one fake punt attempt by the Panthers. This game marked the first time Brady beat the Panthers since 2009, and his first win as a Buccaneer.

Week 3: at Denver Broncos

Tom Brady threw for 297 yards and three touchdown passes, and the Buccaneers defense recorded six sacks and two interceptions in a blowout win over the Broncos. It was Tampa Bay's first win over the Broncos since 1999, and first win in Denver since 1993. Shaquil Barrett returned to Empower Field for the first time since the 2018 season, when he played for the Broncos. He punished his old team, and was named NFC Defensive Player of the Week after, totaling 5 solo tackles, 6 total, three tackles for loss, and two sacks, the first of which was a safety.

Week 4: vs. Los Angeles Chargers

The Chargers jumped out to a 24–7 lead in the second quarter, but the Buccaneers rallied in the second half to win by the score of 38–31. Quarterback Tom Brady, who threw a Pick 6 in the first quarter, rebounded to pass for 369 yards, and 5 touchdown passes (to five different receivers). The Chargers were up by 17 with less than one minute left in the first half. Ndamukong Suh forced a fumble on Joshua Kelley, and the Buccaneers recovered at the Chargers 6-yard line. Brady's touchdown pass to Mike Evans with 28-second left before halftime made the score 24–14, and was the turning point of the game. Tampa Bay scored touchdowns on the first three drives of the second half, and led 38–31 with 2:44 left in the fourth quarter. With 2:35 remaining in regulation, Justin Herbert's pass was intercepted by Carlton Davis near midfield. Tampa Bay ran out the clock, and it was their biggest comeback win since 2008.

Week 5: at Chicago Bears

On Thursday Night Football, the Buccaneers jumped out to a 10–0 lead in the first quarter, but it was thwarted as the Bears scored two touchdowns in the final 1:48 of the first half, including a one-handed 12-yard touchdown reception by Jimmy Graham. In the third quarter, the Buccaneers responded with a long field goal, but Bears kicker Cairo Santos countered with a long field goal of his own. The two teams then traded a field goals. Trailing 20–19 in the final minute of regulation, Tampa Bay was driving near midfield. Quarterback Tom Brady threw an incomplete pass, not realizing it was 4th down, which effectively ended the game. Bears quarterback Nick Foles finished with 243 yards, a touchdown, as well as an interception. Tom Brady finished with 253 yards and one touchdown pass to Mike Evans.

With the loss, the Buccaneers dropped to 3–2. As of the 2021-22 season, this remains Brady's only career loss to the Monsters of the Midway, whom he defeated in five meetings out of five during his two-decade run in New England.

Week 6: vs. Green Bay Packers

Tampa Bay soundly beat previously undefeated Green Bay by the score of 38–10 at Raymond James Stadium, in front of a limited crowd of approximately 25% capacity. Aaron Jones scored a 1-yard touchdown run in the first quarter, as the Packers built a 10–0 lead. But the remainder of the game was dominated by the Buccaneers. Early in the second quarter, Aaron Rodgers' pass was intercepted by Jamel Dean who returned it for a 32-yard touchdown. Three plays later, Rodgers was intercepted again. A tipped pass fell into the hands of Mike Edwards, who ran it back 37 yards to the 2-yard line. Ronald Jones scored the first of two rushing touchdowns, as Tampa Bay took a 14–10 lead. Tom Brady threw two touchdown passes in the second quarter, including his 79th regular season touchdown pass to Rob Gronkowski. The Tampa Bay defense shut out Rodgers and the Packers offense for the rest of the game. Rodgers was sacked five times, and the Packers never crossed midfield in the second half. The Buccaneers also tied a team record with zero penalties, a feat accomplished only once by the club in 1983. This is also their first 4–2 start since 2011.

Down by 28, Rodgers would be benched midway through the fourth quarter and replaced with Tim Boyle. Boyle did not fare well either, as on his third snap, he was sacked by Jason Pierre-Paul. The ball was fumbled, but recovered by the Packers. The game would ultimately be a preview of the NFC Championship Game, in which the Buccaneers beat the top-seeded Packers for the second time this season at Lambeau Field on January 24, 2021.

Week 7: at Las Vegas Raiders

Tampa Bay made their first-ever trip to Las Vegas to face the Raiders. The game was played without spectators. They faced former head coach Jon Gruden for the first time since 1999 and for the first time since Gruden (who was the Buccaneers head coach from 2002 to 2008, winning Super Bowl XXXVII) was fired from the club. Quarterback Tom Brady threw for 369 yards, four touchdown passes, and ran for a touchdown, as the Buccaneers defeated the Raiders 45–20. Derek Carr was sacked three times and intercepted once, as the Tampa Bay defense continued to excel. The Raiders were held to only 76-yard rushing, and the Buccaneers lead the NFL in fewest rushing yards per game allowed. The game was originally scheduled for Sunday Night Football but was moved to 4:05 p.m. after four starting offensive linemen for the Raiders were placed on the reserve/COVID-19 list. Devin White, who was passed on by the Raiders in the 2019 Draft, finished with 11 total tackles, 9 solo, two tackles for loss, and 3 sacks.

Week 8: at New York Giants

Tampa Bay defeated the Giants on Monday Night Football to improve to a record of 6–2, the club's best start since their 2002 Super Bowl-winning season. After a shaky first half for the team, Tom Brady rallied the Buccaneers in the second half for a 25–23 victory. The Giants led 14–6 at halftime, and received the opening kickoff of the second half. On the second play from scrimmage in the third quarter, quarterback Daniel Jones was intercepted by Carlton Davis, which led to a Tampa Bay field goal. After a three-and-out by the Giants, Brady connected with Rob Gronkowski for a 3-yard touchdown pass, and a 15–14 lead. With just over 12 minutes left in regulation, Jones threw his second interception. Hurried and pressured, his pass was picked off by a diving Sean Murphy-Bunting. The turnover led to Brady's second touchdown pass, an 8-yard fingertip grab to a diving Mike Evans in the right corner of the endzone.

In the final three minutes, the Giants were driving for a potential game-tying score. Twice Jones converted on fourth down and long, and connected with Golden Tate for a touchdown with 33 seconds left in regulation. With the score 25–23, the Giants attempted a two-point conversion to tie the game and force overtime. Jones' pass attempt to Dion Lewis was broken up by Antoine Winfield Jr. A flag for pass interference was initially thrown by one of the officials, but after a conference, the flag was picked up and the conversion failed. Tampa Bay held on to win 25–23, their first win at MetLife Stadium, and first win at the Meadowlands since 1997.

Week 9: vs. New Orleans Saints

Tampa Bay hosted New Orleans on Sunday Night Football. The Saints routed the Buccaneers 38–3 to sweep the season series. Tom Brady threw three interceptions in the loss. Tampa Bay snapped a streak of 22 touchdowns scored when facing a "Goal to Go" situation. Early in the third quarter, Tampa Bay recovered a Drew Brees fumble, and subsequently faced a 1st & Goal at the New Orleans 1 yard line. In four plays the Buccaneers could not punch the ball in for a score, and failed to score a touchdown in a game for the first time in two years (Week 10 of 2018). This was the first time in Tom Brady's career that he was swept in two meetings by a division rival in the regular season; it was also the largest margin of defeat for Brady in his career as a starter, surpassing a 31–0 loss to Buffalo in the 2003 season and the worst defeat for an eventual Super Bowl champion in NFL history.

Antonio Brown, signed by Tampa Bay on October 27, made his first appearance with the team. He made three receptions for 31 yards.

Week 10: at Carolina Panthers

Ronald Jones II scored on a 98-yard touchdown run, the longest rush and longest play from scrimmage in team history, as Tampa Bay swept the season series against Carolina. The Buccaneers rebounded after their lopsided loss to the Saints the previous week. Quarterback Tom Brady threw for 341 yards and three touchdown passes, and ran for a touchdown, as Tampa Bay racked up 544 yards of total offense. Carolina led 17–10 late in the second quarter, but Mike Evans made a leaping touchdown catch at the back of the endzone with 27 seconds left in the half to tie the game at 17–17. Miscues then began piling up for the Panthers. Teddy Bridgewater threw an apparent 42-yard catch to D. J. Moore, giving the Panthers a chance for a field goal attempt before halftime. But with seconds left, a delay of game penalty on the Buccaneers, followed by a timeout, allowed officials to review the play. The play was overturned, and the half ended. After the Jones touchdown run midway through the third quarter, Bridgewater threw an interception, which led to a Buccaneers field goal. Bridgewater would later leave the game with a knee injury. Tampa Bay scored points on nine straight drives, including a touchdown run by Brady and a touchdown catch by Rob Gronkowski, both in the fourth quarter, to seal the victory. The Bucs swept the Panthers for the first time since 2010.

Week 11: vs. Los Angeles Rams

Quarterbacks Tom Brady and Jared Goff met for the first time  since Super Bowl LIII. On Monday Night Football, Goff threw for 376 yards and three touchdown passes, as the Rams held off the Buccaneers to win 27–24. Brady finished the game with only 216 yards passing, and threw two interceptions. After a prolific ground performance the week before, Ronald Jones II was held to only 10 carries for 24 yards rushing. With the game tied 24–24, Matt Gay kicked a 40-yard go-ahead field goal with 2:36 left in regulation. Brady and the Buccaneers then took over, looking to score to win or force overtime. Brady's deep pass was intercepted at the 31-yard line, and the Rams secured the victory. It was the third loss in four primetime appearances for the Buccaneers.

The game was significant in NFL history as it featured the first all-African American officiating crew.

Week 12: vs. Kansas City Chiefs

Tyreek Hill racked up 269 yards receiving and three touchdown passes, much of it in the first half, as the defending Super Bowl champions Kansas City outlasted Tampa Bay by the score of 27–24. The Buccaneers lost their second straight game, and third game in four weeks heading into their bye week.

After trailing 20–7 at halftime, the Buccaneers narrowed the deficit. Tom Brady connected with Rob Gronkowski for a 48-yard completion to the Kansas City 5-yard line. They had to settle, however, for a Ryan Succop field goal. Brady connected with Mike Evans for two fourth quarter touchdowns, and closed to within 3 points with 4:14 remaining in regulation. Needing a defensive stop to get the ball back, the Buccaneers could not contain Patrick Mahomes, who first scrambled for two first downs, and then moments later connected with Hill for a game-clinching first down with 1:15 to go. This was the Buccaneers' first loss to the Chiefs since 1993.

This would be a preview of Super Bowl LV, in which the Buccaneers would knock off the Chiefs this time, 31–9.

Week 14: vs. Minnesota Vikings

Coming off their bye week, and after dropping three of their previous four games, Tampa Bay defeated Minnesota 26–14 to improve to 8–5 and bolster their playoff hopes. Quarterback Tom Brady threw for 196 yards and two touchdown passes, but the stories of the day were the miscues and kicking woes by the Vikings. Kicker Dan Bailey missed three field goals and an extra point. Kirk Cousins was sacked six times and had two fumbles (one lost). Three critical defensive penalties on the Vikings also aided the Buccaneers.

The first quarter was dominated by the Vikings, as Dalvin Cook rushed for 78 yards and one touchdown in the first half alone. But the Vikings could not capitalize on the strong start. After Cook's touchdown run, Bailey missed the extra point. Then the next two Vikings drives ended with missed field goal attempts. Midway through the second quarter, Brady connected to Scotty Miller with a 48-yard touchdown bomb and a 7–6 Tampa Bay lead. With 44 seconds left in the half, a 1-yard touchdown run by Ronald Jones II gave Tampa Bay a 14–6 lead. The Vikings went three-and-out, and punted the ball back to Tampa Bay with 21 seconds to go. Brady's deep pass intended for Rob Gronkowski fell incomplete in the endzone as time expired, but the Vikings were called for Pass Interference. With one untimed play, Ryan Succop kicked a chip-shot field goal, and Tampa Bay led 17–6 at halftime.

On the first drive of the third quarter, Brady and Gronkowski connected for a 2-yard touchdown pass, and a 23–6 lead. Late in the fourth quarter, with Tampa Bay leading 26–14, the Vikings were attempting to rally. On 4th down & 13 with 2:13 left in regulation, Jason Pierre-Paul sacked Kirk Cousins, and stripped the ball away for a turnover. The sack thwarted any chance of a comeback, and the Buccaneers ran out the clock to secure the victory.

Leonard Fournette was inactive (coach's decision) for the game, while Ronald Jones II rushed for 80 yards on 18 carries, including one touchdown.

Week 15: at Atlanta Falcons

The Atlanta Falcons jumped out to a 17–0 halftime lead, but Tampa Bay rallied in the second half for a 31–27 victory. Quarterback Tom Brady threw for 390 yards and two touchdown passes - nearly all of it in the second half, as the Buccaneers improved to 9–5 on the season and put themselves on the cusp of clinching a playoff berth.

Matt Ryan racked up 235 passing yards and two touchdown passes in the first half alone, while the Buccaneers were held to only 60 total yards of offense in the first half. Ryan would also pass the 50,000 career passing yards milestone. Brady was mostly ineffective, being sacked twice, and completing only ten passes for 70 yards. Running back Leonard Fournette was held to only three carries for 4 yards. Younghoe Koo kicked a 32-yard field goal with 18 seconds left in the first half, and the Falcons led 17–0 at the half.

The Buccaneers received the ball to start the third quarter, and Brady engineered a spirited comeback. He drove Tampa Bay 80 yards in 7 plays, highlighted by a 32-yard reception to Mike Evans all the way to the 1 yard line. Fournette would pound the ball in for a score on the next play. On their next drive, Brady and Evans connected twice with pivotal catches, which led to another touchdown. With the Falcons leading 24–14 in the closing minutes of the third quarter, the Atlanta defense was called for a double penalty (Pass interference and Face mask) which advanced the Buccaneers to the 17-yard line. Fournette's second touchdown run made the score 24–21 in favor of the Falcons to start the fourth quarter.

The two teams traded field goals, and the Falcons clung to a 27–24 lead. A potential go-ahead touchdown pass from Ryan to Calvin Ridley was knocked away at the last second by Antoine Winfield Jr., then Devin White sacked Ryan for the first time of the game. With 6:19 left in regulation, Brady threw a 46-yard bomb to Antonio Brown for the go-ahead touchdown. It was Brown's first touchdown as a member of the Buccaneers. The Tampa Bay defense stiffened, and forced a three-and-out. With under three minutes left, the Falcons got the ball back, but were pinned at their own 12-yard line. White sacked Ryan for the third time, and two plays later, Atlanta turned the ball over on downs. The Buccaneers managed one first down, and ran out the clock to secure the victory.

Week 16: at Detroit Lions

Tampa Bay clinched a playoff berth for the first time since 2007 defeating Detroit on a record-setting day. The Buccaneers routed the Lions 47–7 at Ford Field on a Saturday afternoon game. The Lions were without multiple members of their coaching staff, due to COVID-19 protocols, and failed to score any points on offense. Quarterback Tom Brady threw for 348 yards and four touchdown passes for a perfect 158.3 passer rating, en route to a 34–0 halftime lead. Brady rested in the second half, and backup Blaine Gabbert took over in the third quarter. The Buccaneers won their third straight game off their bye week, and ended the regular season with a 6–2 road record, tied for the best in team history.

Mike Evans caught ten passes for 181 yards and two touchdowns to bring his season total to 960 yards, just shy of his 7th straight 1,000-yard receiving season. Evans would set an NFL record if he were to become the first player to have 1,000 yards receiving in his first seven seasons. Brady's four touchdown passes put him at 36 total for the year, a single-season franchise record. It was also Brady's 300th career regular season game. The Buccaneers offense had 410 net yards of offense in the first half, and 588 total yards in the game, both club records. The 34–0 halftime lead was the largest such in team history, and the 40-point winning margin was the second-largest in team history.

Trailing 40–0, the Lions finally got on the board midway through the third quarter with a 74-yard punt return touchdown by Jamal Agnew. Quarterback Matthew Stafford left the game early with an ankle injury, and backups David Blough and Chase Daniel combined for only 135 yards, 4 sacks, and 1 interception.

Rob Gronkowski scored on two touchdown passes, and Antonio Brown got his second touchdown reception with the Buccaneers. One day earlier on Christmas Day, New Orleans clinched the NFC South division title. Tampa Bay with the victory, secured a wild card berth, their first playoff appearance in thirteen seasons. It is also their first appearance as a wild card team since 2001.

Week 17: vs. Atlanta Falcons

Quarterback Tom Brady threw for 399 yards and four touchdown passes as Tampa Bay swept the Falcons on the season. The Buccaneers finished the regular season with a record of 11–5, their best finish since 2005, and secured the fifth seed in the NFC playoffs. Brady's four touchdown passes brought his season total to 40, a single-season franchise record.

In the first quarter, Mike Evans made three receptions for 46 yards, to become the first player in NFL history to record 1,000+ receiving yards in his first seven seasons. However, on the play after setting the record, Evans was targeted in the endzone, where he slipped on the slick sod. He hyperextended his knee, and was out for the remainder of the game.

With Tampa Bay leading 23–20 after three-quarters, the Buccaneers put the game out of reach in the fourth quarter. Ronald Jones II scored on a rushing touchdown, then Chris Godwin and Antonio Brown each caught their second respective touchdown passes of the game.

Standings

Division

Conference

Postseason

Schedule

Game summaries

NFC Wild Card Playoffs: at (4) Washington Football Team

Tampa Bay racked up 507 yards of offense, 3 sacks, and 2 interceptions as they earned their first postseason victory since Super Bowl XXXVII in the 2002 season.

Buccaneers quarterback Tom Brady completed a 30-yard pass to Mike Evans and a 17-yard throw to Chris Godwin as he led the team to a 29-yard Ryan Succop field goal on the game's opening drive. Then after a punt from each team, Tampa Bay defensive back Sean Murphy-Bunting intercepted a pass from Taylor Heinicke on the Buccaneers 42-yard line. Tampa Bay then drove 58 yards in six plays to score on Brady's 36-yard touchdown pass to Antonio Brown, giving the team a 9–0 lead after Succop's extra point was blocked by Jeremy Reaves. But Heinicke stormed right back, starting the next drive with completions to Logan Thomas and Terry McLaurin for gains of 24 and 18 yards before J. D. McKissic finished it off with a 2-yard touchdown run, making the score 9–7 with 12:58 left in the second quarter.

Dustin Hopkins' short kickoff gave the Bucs a first down on their own 39-yard line.  On the next play, Brown took a pitch on an end around and ran for a 22-yard gain.  Three plays later, Brady threw a 27-yard touchdown pass to Godwin, giving the Bucs a 15–7 lead after their two-point conversion attempt failed.  Then after a punt, Brady completed 3/5 passes for 65 yards on an 82-yard drive that ended with Succop's 23-yard field goal, giving Tampa Bay an 18–7 lead going into halftime.

Washington cut their deficit to 18–10 with the opening drive of the third quarter, converting Heinicke's 29-yard completion to Thomas into a 36-yard Hopkins field goal.  Later in the period, Washington Defensive tackle Daron Payne forced a fumble from Ke'Shawn Vaughn that Jon Bostic recovered for the Football Team on their 39-yard line.  Heinkicke then completed a 19-yard pass to Cam Sims and rushed for a 13-yard gain before taking the ball into the end zone himself on an 8-yard touchdown run, cutting the deficit to 18-16 after an unsuccessful 2-point try.  Tampa Bay responded with a 9-play, 55-yard drive, the longest a 23-yard catch by tight end Cameron Brate.  Succop finished it off with a 38-yard field goal, giving the Buccaneers a 21–16 lead with 13:38 left in the fourth quarter.

Following a Washington punt, Brady completed passes to Evans for gains of 20 and 19 yards, while Leonard Fournette rushed three times for 22 yards, the last carry a 3-yard touchdown run that put his team up 28–16.  Heinicke stormed back, completing 8/10 passes for 71 yards and finishing the drive with an 11-yard touchdown completion to Steven Sims.  With the score now 28-23 and 4:57 left on the clock, Brady completed a 35-yard pass to Evans and a 16-yard strike to Godwin, setting up Succop's 37-yard field goal at 3:37.  Washington then drove across midfield, but after two incompletions and an 11-yard sack by Lavonte David, Heinicke's 4th down pass was incomplete, enabling Tampa Bay to run out the rest of the game clock.

Brady completed 22/40 passes for 381 yards and two touchdowns.  Fournette rushed for 93 yards and a touchdown, while also catching 4 passes for 39 yards.  Evans caught 6 passes for 119 yards.  David had 8 solo tackles and 1 sack.  In just his second NFL start, Heinicke completed 26/44 passes for 302 yards and a touchdown, with one interception.  He was also Washington's leading rusher with 6 carries for 46 yards and a score.  Sims had 7 receptions for 104 yards.  Reaves blocked an extra point and had 9 solo tackles.

NFC Divisional Playoffs: at (2) New Orleans Saints

Tampa Bay forced four turnovers in a winning effort against a Saints team that had defeated them twice during the regular season. Buccaneers linebacker Devin White led the defensive effort with 10 tackles (1 for loss), 1 assist, a fumble recovery, and an interception.

The Buccaneers had to punt on their opening drive, and Deonte Harris' 43-yard return gave New Orleans a first down on the Tampa 21-yard line, setting up Wil Lutz' 23-yard field goal to take a 3–0 lead. The next time Tampa Bay punted, Harris returned it for a touchdown, but an illegal block penalty negated the score. Still, the team managed to drive 36 yards to a 6–0 lead on Lutz' 44-yard kick. The Bucs responded by moving the ball 65 yards in 15 plays to score on Ryan Succop's 26-yard field goal with 13 minutes left in the second quarter.

On the Saints next drive, defensive back Sean Murphy-Bunting intercepted a pass from Drew Brees and returned it 36 yards to the New Orleans 3-yard line, setting up Tom Brady's 3-yard scoring pass to Mike Evans that gave Tampa Bay a 10–6 lead. New Orleans took the ball back and drove to their 44. On the next play, running back Alvin Kamara took a snap out of wildcat formation and gave the ball to receiver Emmanuel Sanders, who then pitched the ball to backup quarterback Jameis Winston. Winston then threw the ball to Tre'Quan Smith for a 56-yard touchdown, putting the Saints back in the lead at 13–10. Following a punt from each team, the Buccaneers drove 68 yards to tie the score 13–13 with Succop's 37-yard field goal on the last play of the half.

New Orleans opened the third quarter with a 10-play 75-yard drive, with Kamara rushing 4 times for 32 yards and catching a pass for 7. Brees finished the possession with a 16-yard touchdown pass to Smith, giving the Saints a 20–13 lead. The Saints defense then forced a punt, but on their next drive, safety Antoine Winfield Jr. forced a fumble from Jared Cook that White recovered and returned 18 yards to the Saints 40. Brady started the ensuing possession with a 19-yard pass to tight end Cameron Brate, and finished it with a 6-yard touchdown completion to running back Leonard Fournette, tying the game at 20. After a Saints punt, Brady's completions to Tyler Johnson and Scotty Miller for gains of 15 and 29-yard yards set up Succop's 37-yard field goal, giving Tampa Bay a 23–20 lead with 9:57 left in the game.

White put an end to New Orleans' next drive, intercepting Brees and returning the ball 28 yards to the Saints 20-yard line. Three plays later, Brady scored on a 1-yard sneak that increased the Bucs lead to 30–20 with 4:57 left on the clock. Then Brees was picked off for a third time, this one by safety Mike Edwards, allowing Tampa Bay to run out the clock.

Brady completed 18 of 33 passes for 199 yards and two touchdowns, and scored a rushing touchdown as he advanced to his 14th conference championship game in 21 seasons. Brees was held to just 19/34 completions for 134 yards and a touchdown, while being intercepted three times. Kamara was the top rusher of the game with 18 carries for 85 yards, while also catching 3 passes for 20 yards. Michael Thomas  caught 0 passes on four targets, and Mike Edwards  caught two interceptions.

NFC Championship: at (1) Green Bay Packers

Despite giving up more yards and losing more turnovers than Green Bay, Tampa still managed to earn their second Super Bowl appearance in franchise history. With the win, the Buccaneers became the first NFL team in history to play a Super Bowl in their home stadium.

Tampa Bay took the opening kickoff and drove 66 yards on a drive that featured three third down conversions. First, Tom Brady converted a 3rd and 4 with a 27-yard pass to Mike Evans. Then on 3rd and 9, he threw a 14-yard completion to Chris Godwin. Finally, Brady finished the possession with a 15-yard touchdown pass to Evans on 3rd and 7, giving the Buccaneers a 7–0 lead. Following a punt from each team, Green Bay tied the score 7–7 on a 90-yard drive in which Aaron Rodgers converted a 3rd and 15 with a 23-yard pass to Allen Lazard before throwing a 50-yard touchdown completion to Marquez Valdes-Scantling. Tampa Bay took the ball back, and made another big 3rd down conversion with Brady's 52-yard pass to Godwin on 3rd and 9. On the next play, Leonard Fournette's 20-yard touchdown run made the score 14–7 with 12:30 left in the second quarter.

Green Bay responded by driving 69 yards in 15 plays to cut the score to 14–10 with Mason Crosby's 24-yard field goal. Their defense then forced a punt, but on the Packers next drive, Sean Murphy-Bunting intercepted a pass from Rodgers on the Bucs 49-yard line with 27 seconds left in the half. Tampa Bay then drove to a 4th and 4 on the Packers 45, managing to convert it with a 6-yard catch by Fournette. Now with the ball on the 39 and 8 seconds remaining, Tampa Bay decided against kicking a long field goal, a choice that paid off as Brady threw a 39-yard touchdown pass to Scotty Miller, ending the half with the Buccaneers ahead 21–10. In the first half alone, Brady completed 13 of 22 passes for 202 yards and two touchdowns.

Two plays into the third quarter, safety Jordan Whitehead forced a fumble from Packers running back Aaron Jones. Devin White recovered it for Tampa Bay and returned it 21 yards to the Green Bay 8-yard line. On the next play, Tampa Bay fooled the Packers defense with a play-action pass, with Brady faking a handoff in the backfield before throwing the ball to tight end Cameron Brate for a touchdown and a 28–10 lead.  Green Bay stormed right back, with Rodgers completing 5 of 6 passes for 68 yards and finishing the drive with an 8-yard touchdown throw to tight end Robert Tonyan, making the score 28–17. Then safety Adrian Amos intercepted a pass from Brady on the Packers 32-yard line, sparking a 13-play, 68-yard drive that ended with Rodgers'; 2-yard touchdown completion to Davante Adams with 17 seconds left in the period. This cut the deficit to 28–23 after receiver Equanimeous St. Brown dropped Rodgers' pass on a 2-point conversion attempt.

Tampa Bay then drove to the Packers 28-yard line, only to lose the ball again when Brady threw an interception to cornerback Jaire Alexander. Green Bay could not get a first down and had to punt after Shaquil Barrett sacked Rodgers for a 10-yard loss on 3rd and 5. Then Brady was picked off for the third time, throwing another interception to Alexander. Green Bay's next possession fared no better than their last, with Rodgers again being sacked by Barrett and the team again going three-and-out. Tampa Bay took the ball back on their own 28, and went on to drive 44 yards in 8 plays, the longest a 29-yard gain on a screen pass from Brady to Rob Gronkowski. On the last play, Ryan Succop's 46-yard field goal gave the Bucs a 31–23 lead with 4:47 left in the game.

Green Bay then drove to a first and goal from the Buccaneers 8-yard line. After two incompletions, Rodgers appeared to have room to run toward the end zone, but he chose to throw the ball to a well covered Adams, which resulted in another incompletion. Then in a choice that later earned him heavy criticism, coach Matt LaFleur decided not to attempt a tying touchdown on 4th and goal from the 8 with 2:09 left on the clock, instead electing to have Crosby kick a field goal that cut his team's deficit to 5 points, 31–26. This did not pay off as Tampa Bay went on to run out the rest of the clock with three first downs. The Bucs started their ensuing drive with a 9-yard pass from Brady to Evans as the clock ran down to the 2-minute warning. Then Green Bay decided to give the Bucs a first down rather than lose a timeout on a 2nd and 1 play, so they deliberately committed an encroachment penalty. Two plays later on 3rd and 4, defensive back Kevin King was flagged for pass interference while trying to cover Tyler Johnson, giving the Bucs another first down. Tampa Bay went on to clinch the game with Godwin's 6-yard run on third and 5.

Brady completed 20 of 36 passes for 280 yards and three touchdowns, with three interceptions, as he advanced to his 10th Super Bowl in 21 seasons. Godwin was his top target with 5 receptions for 110 yards. White had 9 tackles, 6 assists, and a fumble recovery. Barrett had 3 sacks, while his fellow defensive lineman Jason Pierre-Paul had 2. Rodgers completed 33 of 48 passes for 346 yards and 3 touchdowns, with one interception, as he lost his second consecutive conference championship game and fell to 1–4 overall in Conference title games over his 16 seasons. Valdes-Scantling caught 4 passes for 115 yards and a score.  Nose Tackle Kenny Clark had 6 tackles (1 for loss), 2 assists, and a sack.

Super Bowl LV: vs. (A1) Kansas City Chiefs

With a strong defensive performance and a balanced offense, the Buccaneers easily defeated the defending Super Bowl champion Kansas City Chiefs 31–9 in a rematch of Week 12 from the regular season. This was the Tampa Bay Buccaneers' first Super Bowl appearance since Super Bowl XXXVII. They made history by becoming the first team to host the Super Bowl in their own stadium. The Buccaneers had led the all-time series between the two clubs at 7–6, and also hold a 3–1 edge in games played at Raymond James Stadium. The Buccaneers were the designated home team, due to being the NFC representative this season, but elected to wear their road white uniforms rather than home red uniforms.

Tampa Bay received the opening kickoff and returned it to their own 23-yard line but were unable to gain a 1st down and were forced to punt. Kansas City proceeded to move the ball near midfield but after an incompletion were forced to punt as well. Tampa Bay proceeded to stall on their ensuing drive following a sack by Frank Clark, and on Kansas City's next drive they were able to move the ball into Tampa's territory. However, following an incompletion from Patrick Mahomes to Tyreek Hill on 3rd and long the Chiefs were forced to settle for a 49-yard field goal by Harrison Butker to score the first points of the game and gain a 3–0 lead, this would be Kansas City's only lead of the game. On Tampa's ensuing drive the Buccaneers took the ball 70 yards on 8 plays, culminating in an 8-yard touchdown pass from Tom Brady to Rob Gronkowski. Following a successful point after try the Buccaneers would end the 1st quarter up 7–3.

During Tampa Bay's 1st possession of the 2nd quarter they were able to move the ball into Kansas City's red zone following a 31-yard pass completion from Brady to Mike Evans to set up 1st and goal, however despite 4 attempts for a score the Kansas City defense was able to force a turnover on downs on 4th down after preventing Ronald Jones from reaching the goal line. After stalling out in their next possession a holding penalty against Kansas City canceled out a 56-yard punt which would have set up the Buccaneers to start at their own 30-yard line, and on the ensuing retry Tommy Townsend shanked the punt, sending it only 29 yards which resulted in Tampa Bay being able to start at the Kansas City 38-yard line. On the following drive critical penalties extended Tampa Bay's possession, a holding penalty on Charvarius Ward negated what would have been an interception by Tyrann Mathieu and an offside penalty during a field goal attempt provided Tampa Bay with a new set on downs. On the following play Brady once again found Gronkowski in the end zone for a 17-yard touchdown, which after a successful point after try gave Tampa a 14–3 lead. During Kansas City's next drive multiple long completions from Mahomes to Travis Kelce helped bring the Chiefs into Tampa Bay's red zone for the first time in the game, but they were forced to settle for a 34-yard field goal by Butker to bring the score to 14–6. During Tampa Bay's next drive multiple penalties on Kansas City's defense moved the Buccaneers deep into the Chiefs' territory, most notably a defensive pass interference penalty by Bashaud Breeland resulting in a gain of 34 yards and a defensive pass interference on Mathieu in the end zone which gave the Buccaneers 1st and goal at the 1-yard line. Brady would then find Antonio Brown for a 1-yard touchdown pass which after a successful point after try gave Tampa Bay a 21–6 lead at halftime.

Kansas City received the ball to begin the 3rd quarter, and following long runs by Clyde Edwards-Helaire and a completion from Mahomes to Kelce the Chiefs were able to move into Tampa Bay's territory once again. However, they were forced to settle for a 52-yard field goal by Butker to bring the score to 21–9. On Tampa Bay's ensuing drive the Buccaneers were able to bring the ball into Chiefs' territory following a 25-yard completion from Brady to Gronkowski, and on the next play Leonard Fournette scored a 27-yard touchdown run which following a successful point after try gave the Buccaneers a 28–9 lead. On the Chiefs' next drive a deflection by Mike Edwards led to an interception by Antoine Winfield Jr. to give the Buccaneers' offense starting field position at the Kansas City 45-yard line. As the Buccaneers were driving a botched snap on 3rd down forced them to settle for a 52-yard field goal by Ryan Succop to extend their lead to 31–9. On Kansas City's following drive long completions from Mahomes to Hill, Kelce, and Sammy Watkins were able to take the Chiefs deep into Tampa Bay territory but the Chiefs were unable to score following an incompletion by Mahomes to Darrel Williams on 4th down which resulted in a turnover on downs.

In the 4th quarter the Buccaneers were ultimately forced to punt at midfield, and on the Chiefs' ensuing drive long completions from Mahomes to Kelce and Hill as well as a roughing the passer penalty on Ndamukong Suh were able to once again bring them deep into Tampa Bay territory, however Tampa Bay's defense was able to hold and force another turnover on downs on 4th down. Following a punt on a quickly stalled drive by the Buccaneers, the Chiefs were again able to move into the Buccaneers' territory following long completions from Mahomes to Kelce, Edwards-Helaire, and Demarcus Robinson but once again Tampa Bay's defense held firm and forced another takeaway as Devin White intercepted the ball at the goal line. Brady and the Buccaneers would then kneel the ball on the following drive to end the game and give Tampa their 2nd Super Bowl title in franchise history.

Brady completed 21 of 29 passes for 201 yards and 3 touchdowns, as he extended his own record for Super Bowl victories with his 7th as well as his own record for Super Bowl MVP awards with his 5th. As a result of this win Brady would tie Otto Graham for the most championships by a player in the history of professional football with his 7th, as well as join Peyton Manning as the only QBs to win a Super Bowl with 2 different franchises. Brady also became the first professional athlete in any of the 4 major American sports to win a championship with 2 different teams after turning 40, as well as the first player in NFL history to defeat 3 former Super Bowl MVPs in the same postseason (Mahomes, Drew Brees, and Aaron Rodgers) and the first player in NFL history to win a championship in 3 different decades. Gronkowski would be his top target for the game, as he recorded 6 catches for 67 yards and 2 touchdowns. With Gronkowski's 2nd touchdown reception he and Brady broke the record for the most touchdowns from a QB to a pass catcher in postseason history with their 14th together, the record previously being held by Joe Montana and Jerry Rice with 13. Fournette would finish with 16 carries for 89 yards and a touchdown to go along with 4 receptions for 46 yards while Jones would add an additional 61 yards on 12 carries as well. Fournette would also join Terrell Davis and Larry Fitzgerald as the only players in NFL history to score 1+ scrimmage TDs in 4 games of a single postseason. White would finish with a team leading 12 tackles as well as 1 pass deflection and 1 interception, Winfield Jr. would also record an interception to go along with 6 tackles and 2 pass deflections. Suh would finish with a team leading 1.5 sacks while Shaquil Barrett would also gain 1 sack and Cam Gill would record half of a sack. Ryan Succop would make all 5 of his kicks in the game. Mahomes completed 26 of 49 passes for 270 yards, no touchdowns, and 2 interceptions. This would be the first time since becoming a starter that an offense led by Mahomes would not be able to score a touchdown in a game as well as the first time Mahomes has lost a game by double digit points since college. Kelce would be his top target with 10 receptions for 133 yards. Edwards-Helaire would be their top rusher with 9 carries for 64 yards as well as having 2 receptions for 23 yards. Damien Wilson would be their top tackler with 10 total tackles, and Clark would have 4 tackles and 1 sack. Butker made all 3 of his kicks in the game.

Notes

Awards
 NFC Offensive Player of the Week
 Week 4: Tom Brady
 NFC Defensive Player of the Week
 Week 3: Shaquil Barrett
 Week 7: Devin White
 Week 15: Devin White
 NFC Special Teams Player of the Week
 Week 8: Ryan Succop
 Week 17: Ryan Succop
 NFC Offensive Player of the Month (October): Tom Brady
 NFC Defensive Player of the Month (September): Lavonte David
 Defensive Rookie of the Month (September): Antoine Winfield Jr.
 FedEx Air Player of the Week
 Week 4: Tom Brady
 Week 17: Tom Brady
 FedEx Ground Player of the Week
 Week 10: Ronald Jones II
 Super Bowl MVP: Tom Brady

References

External links
 

Tampa Bay
Tampa Bay Buccaneers seasons
Tampa Bay Buccaneers
National Football Conference championship seasons
Super Bowl champion seasons